Caribbean Sunset is the ninth solo studio album by Welsh rock musician John Cale, released in January 1984 by ZE Records.

Release
Caribbean Sunset was released on vinyl and cassette in 1984 by ZE Records. It was reissued on vinyl by Mango in 1990. Both the ZE and Mango vinyl versions are now out of print.

"Villa Albani" was released as a 12" single in Germany. "Caribbean Sunset" was issued as a promo 7" in the UK.

To date, the album remains unavailable on CD or MP3, though a remastered download with two bonus tracks was made available on the ZE Records website in 2011.

The album features contributions from Brian Eno and an otherwise "young unknown" band, that consisted of David Young on guitar, Andrew Heermans on bass guitar, and David Lichtenstein (son of artist Roy Lichtenstein) on drums.

The cover photograph was taken by Risé Irushalmi Cale.

Critical reception

Upon release, Caribbean Sunset received negative reviews from critics. In a retrospective review for AllMusic, critic Stewart Mason panned the album, calling it "something of a mess. The songs are among the poppiest of Cale's career, and one gets the sense that it's meant to be Cale's attempt at a straight-up pop album, especially given the Jimmy Buffett-like title and cover photo." Trouser Press called it his "least interesting album to date", adding that "even if the puzzlingly muddy self-production hadn't stifled everything but his jagged-edged vocals, the songs themselves are too flimsy to support his words or passion.".

Track listing

Personnel
Adapted from the Caribbean Sunset liner notes.

Musicians
 John Cale – vocals; keyboards; guitar
 Dave Young – guitar; backing vocals
 Andy Heermans – bass guitar; backing vocals
 David Lichtenstein – drums; boobams
 Brian Eno – A.M.S pitch changer (effects)

Production
 John Cale – producer; mixing
 Tom Roberts – associate producer
 Tim "Thilby" Crich – assistant engineer
 David Schecterson – assistant engineer
 Andy Heermans – engineer on "Magazines"
 Rob O'Connor – sleeve design
 Risé Irushalmi Cale – cover photography

References

External links
 

John Cale albums
1984 albums
Albums produced by John Cale
ZE Records albums